Tatiya Myaut Sone Mat is a 2019 Burmese action television series. It aired on MRTV-4, from August 30 to October 21, 2019, on Mondays to Fridays at 20:45 for 37 episodes.

Cast

Main
Hein Htet as Say Ta Man
Myat Thu Thu as Yoon May Kha
 Shin Mway La as Swan Yi
May Mi Ko Ko as Ngwe Pan Chi

Supporting
 Min Oo as U Nay Mahar
 Nay Myo Aung as U Oak Soe Khant
 Nyi Nanda as U Myo Myint Htin
 Pwint Nadi Maung as Daw Nu May
Mya Hnin Yee Lwin as Daw Zar Chi Thin
 Saw Min Yar as Lin Bo
 Jar Seng Eain as Nay Yi Yi
 Ingyin Htoo as Lu Lu

References

Burmese television series
MRTV (TV network) original programming